Keaontay Ingram (born October 26, 1999) is an American football running back for the Arizona Cardinals of the National Football League (NFL). He played college football at Texas and USC.

Early life and high school
Ingram grew up in Carthage, Texas and attended Carthage High School, where he played football, ran track and played basketball. He won a 4A Division I state title in 2016, while being named Offensive MVP of the championship game. He helped Carthage to a 16–0 overall record, including a 6–0 district mark, a district title, and a 49–21 win over Kennedale in the 4A Division I state title game in 2017.

He was one of three finalists for the Mr. Texas Football High School Player of the Year Award. He played in the 2018 Under Armour All-America Game. He was an All-America, all-state and two-time all-district honoree. He holds the Carthage school record for career rushing touchdowns with 76. He is one of three athletes with more than 5,000 career yards, and one of two to have back-to-back 2,000-yard seasons.

Ingram was rated a four-star recruit and committed to play college football at Texas over scholarship offers from 26 other programs.

College football 
In his first year at Texas he played 13 games and started two of them. He rushed a total of 708 yards, had three touchdowns and added 27 receptions for 170 yards and two scores. In the 2018 Big 12 Championship Game he rushed only seven yards. In the 2019 Sugar Bowl which Texas won he rushed 25 yards and added three catches for 24 yards. As a sophomore he played and started 13 games in which he rushed 853 yards and had six touchdowns. He also caught 29 passes for 242 yards and three touchdowns. He rushed 108 yards and also caught two passes for 26 yards and a touchdown in the 2019 Alamo Bowl which Texas won by a score of 38–10. His four 100-yard games as a sophomore were the most by a Longhorn since D'Onta Foreman in 2016 and one of seven Longhorns to rush for more than 100 yards on at least four occasions during a single season since 2000. In the shortened season of 2020 he played six games and started three times. He rushed 250 yards for one touchdown, and caught 11 passes for 103 yards and one touchdown. He was selected that year to the Academic All-Big 12 First-team. And he was selected Big 12 Commissioner’s Honor Roll in the springs of 2019 and 2020.

After three seasons at Texas, he transferred to USC, where he gained over 1,000 yards from scrimmage in his senior year. He rushed for 911 yards and 5 touchdowns and received for 156 yards. He appeared in 10 games and started in seven of them. His season ended early due to a season-ending rib injury. He earned 2021 All-Pac-12 honorable mention, Pro Football Focus All-Pac-12 second-team and Phil Steele All-Pac-12 fourth team. He won USC’s 2021 Jack Oakie “Rise and Shine” Award. He was a 2022 NFLPA Collegiate Bowl and East-West Shrine Bowl invitee. He declared for the 2022 NFL Draft in January.

College statistics

Professional career

Ingram was selected by the Arizona Cardinals in the sixth round with the 201st pick of the 2022 NFL Draft. He signed on May 19 with the Cardinals on a rookie contract of four years. He played his first game for Arizona in the first preseason game against the Cincinnati Bengals. On November 14, 2022, backup running back Eno Benjamin was released, making Ingram the backup in Arizona alongside former Chiefs running back Darrel Williams at backup.

References

External links
 Arizona Cardinals bio
 Texas Longhorns bio
 USC Trojans bio

1999 births
Living people
People from Carthage, Texas
Players of American football from Texas
American football running backs
Texas Longhorns football players
USC Trojans football players
Arizona Cardinals players